Qianyou may refer to:

Qianyou Subdistrict (乾佑街道), a subdistrict in Zhashui County, Shaanxi, China

Historical eras
Qianyou (乾祐, 948–951), era name used by Liu Chengyou, emperor of Later Han, later continued by the Northern Han emperors Liu Chong and Liu Chengjun until 956
Qianyou (乾祐, 1170–1193), era name used by Emperor Renzong of Western Xia